The 90th 2016 Lunar New Year Cup, is the annual football event held in Hong Kong to celebrate Chinese New Year. The event was held by the Hong Kong Football Association. 3 matches were played.

Teams
All teams came from Hong Kong this year.

First match (40 minutes): 
 Hong Kong Women 80s
 Hong Kong Women 90s

Second match (40 minutes): 
 Hong Kong Classics
 Foreign Player Classics

Final match (90 minutes): 
 Hong Kong Representative Team
 Hong Kong League XI

Squads

Hong Kong Women 80s
 Team manager: Mr. Eric Fok
 Head coach: Chan Shuk Chi
 Assistant coach: Lam Siu Ying
 Technical Staff: Lai Ka Shing

Hong Kong Women 90s
 Team manager: Mrs. Josephine Mark Lee
 Head coach: Wong Yeuk Ling Betty
 Assistant coach: Lee Mei Fan, Ip Yik Wing
 Technical Staff: Mak Chin Wai

Hong Kong Classics
 Team manager: Mr. Lawrence Yu Kam-kee, Mr. Brian Leung Hung-tak
 Coach: Kwok Ka Ming, Wong Man Wai
 Assistant: Philip Lee Fai-lup

Foreign Player Classics
 Team manager: Mr. Samuel Choi Lin-hung, Mr. Chow Man Kit
 Coach: Anílton da Conceição, Tim Bredbury

Hong Kong Representative Team
 Honorary Team Managers: Mr. Peter Mok Yiu-keung, Mr. Chim Pui Chung
 Coach: Kim Pan-gon

Hong Kong League XI
 Honorary Team Managers: Mr. Pui Kwan Kay, Ms. Canny Leung Tsz-shan
 Coach: José Ricardo Rambo
 Assistant: Kwok Kar Lok Kenneth, Law Kwok Ho

Results

First match

Second match

Final match

References

Lunar New Year Cup
Lunar